Nikitha Narayan is an Indian actress and model. Working as a model since the age of 10, she entered the Telugu film industry in 2011 after participating and winning beauty pageants.

Early life and family
Nikitha was born to Kannada parents on 19 May in Bengaluru, Karnataka. Her father works in the advertising and corporate communications field and her mother is a qualified interior designer, who opted to be a home maker. She has a younger sister.

She graduated in Bachelor of Management Studies from the St. Francis College, Begumpet, Hyderabad. She interned as a Business Analyst at Goldman sachs Bangalore and later got placed in the Facebook company. After her first film, she worked for Amazon.com.

She studied and grew up in Bengaluru, Mysore, Chennai, Vizag and Hyderabad, where she spent most of her time.

Career

Modelling
Nikitha's modeling career began at the age of 10, when she worked with noted director Rajiv Menon on a television advertisement for Annapurna Iodised salt. It was followed by ads for Fair & Lovely and other brands over the next few years. In 2009 she won the Dabur Miss Fresh Face of Hyderabad, after which she participated at the 2010 Miss South India contest, earning the second runner-up title  along with a host of sub-titles (Miss Congeniality and Miss Beautiful Skin). She next represented the Southern region alongside three other models at the Miss Queen of India 2011. She finished under the Top 5 and won the Miss Beautiful Eyes title.

Nikitha has also walked the ramp in many fashion shows and designer week, and has modeled for brands in various categories including jewelry and clothing.

Acting
In November 2011, Nikitha entered the film industry when she won the lead role in the Telugu film It's My Love Story directed by Madhura Sreedhar Reddy. The film ran successfully for over 50 days across Andhra Pradesh and she received good reviews for her performance. The Hindu wrote that she "makes a sparkling debut"  and Rediff wrote that she "looks fresh and has the potential to grow into an actor". She was nominated in the Best Female Debutant category at the 1st South Indian International Movie Awards held in Dubai.

Later, she worked for a Telugu project titled Race under Bhavya creations banner which got released on 1 March 2013. Her next film was a bilingual project titled Made in Vizag in Telugu  and Nee Naan Mattum in Tamil. A remake of the Marathi film, Mumbai-Pune-Mumbai, it was directed by Kanmani. Her first 2015 release was Ladies & Gentlemen directed by Manjunath, in which she was seen as a homemaker. A week later, she was seen in Pesarattu, which was the first crowd funded Telugu film.

She did a movie with the renowned yesteryear national award winning director Vamsy's Vennello Hai Hai opposite Ajmal of Ko fame.

Filmography

References

External links
 

Living people
Kannada people
Actresses from Bangalore
Indian film actresses
Actresses in Telugu cinema
21st-century Indian actresses
1992 births
Actresses in Kannada cinema
Female models from Bangalore